Scopula tensipallida is a moth of the  family Geometridae. It is found in Burma.

References

Moths described in 1938
tensipallida
Moths of Asia